Once a Thief is a 1935 British, black-and-white, crime film directed by George Pearson and starring John Stuart as Roger Drummond. It was produced by British & Dominions Film Corporation and Paramount British Pictures.

Synopsis
The manager steals a chemist's paint formula while he is in gaol for gem theft.

Cast
 John Stuart as Roger Drummond
 Nancy Burne as Marion Ashley
 Lewis Shaw as Frank Ashley
 Derek Gorst as George Marston
 Frederick Culley as Sir John Chirwin
 Lola Duncan as Mrs. Eagle
 Joan Kemp-Welch as Alice
 Ronald Shiner as Man

References

External links
 
 
 

1935 films
1935 crime films
British black-and-white films
1930s English-language films
Films directed by George Pearson
British crime films
Films produced by Anthony Havelock-Allan
British and Dominions Studios films
Films shot at Imperial Studios, Elstree
1930s British films